Phyciodes, the crescents or crescent spots (like some related genera) is a genus of butterflies of the subfamily Nymphalinae in the family Nymphalidae.

Species
In alphabetical order:
 Phyciodes batesii (Reakirt, 1865) – tawny crescent
 Phyciodes cocyta (Cramer, [1777]) – northern crescent
 Phyciodes graphica (R. Felder, 1869) – Vesta crescent
 Phyciodes mylitta (W. H. Edwards, 1861) – Mylitta crescent
 Phyciodes orseis W. H. Edwards, 1871 – Orseis crescent
 Phyciodes pallescens (R. Felder, 1869) – Mexican crescent
 Phyciodes pallida or Phyciodes pallidus (W. H. Edwards, 1864) – pale crescent or pallid crescentspot
 Phyciodes picta (W. H. Edwards, 1865) – painted crescent
 Phyciodes phaon (W. H. Edwards, 1864) – Phaon crescent
 Phyciodes pulchella (Boisduval, 1852) – field crescent
 Phyciodes texana (W. H. Edwards, 1863) – Texan crescent
 Phyciodes tharos (Drury, [1773]) – pearl crescent

References

Phyciodes, BugGuide

Melitaeini
Butterfly genera
Taxa named by Jacob Hübner